Frank Frederick Cuisset (23 February 1812 – 1891) was a composer and organist based in Birmingham and Godalming.

Life

He was born on 23 February 1812 in Holborn, Middlesex, the son of John Patrick Cuisset.

He studied music under Sir Henry Bishop, Henry Brinley Richards and Sir George Smart. An advertisement in the Birmingham Gazette of Saturday 6 October 1860 describes him as Professor of Singing, formerly of the Royal Academy of Music and St Paul's Cathedral.

He married Mary Ann Watkins, daughter of Thomas Watkins, on 19 July 1860 in St Saviour's Church, Paddington.  They had one daughter, Florence Mary A Cuisset (b. 1865).

He died in 1891 in Godalming, Surrey.

Appointments

Organist at Holy Trinity Church, Coventry 1856 - 1860 
Organist at Bishop Ryder Church, Birmingham
Organist at St Mary's Church, Selly Oak, Birmingham
Organist at St John the Baptist Church, Busbridge, Godalming

Compositions

He was the author of The Vocalist's Indispensable Practice, a series of exercises for promoting the strength and flexibility of the voice, published in London in 1875.

He was also a composer of concerted vocal music, songs, hymn tunes, etc. His tune 'Harnal' was first published in Congregational Church Music, London, 1853.

References

1812 births
1891 deaths
English organists
British male organists
English composers
People from Holborn
19th-century British composers
19th-century English musicians
19th-century British male musicians
19th-century organists